Gary Ryan may refer to:

 Gary Ryan (athlete) (born 1972), former Irish sprinter
 Gary Ryan (philatelist) (1916–2008), British philatelist
 Gary Ryan (guitarist) (born 1969), British guitarist